Saukin Wind, also written Saukanwind, Saukinwind and Sokanwind, is a village in Pasrur Tehsil, Sialkot District, Punjab, Pakistan located on road Pasrur - Qila Kalar Wala.

References

Villages in Sialkot District